"Go with Me to That Land" or "Come and Go with Me (to That Land)" is a traditional gospel blues song recorded on April 20, 1930 by Blind Willie Johnson with backing vocals by Willie B. Harris, who may have been his first wife. It was released as a single on Columbia 14597-D, backed with "Everybody Ought to Treat a Stranger Right".

Lyrics 
The lyrics express a Christian believer's expectation of a better life after this mortal one. The chorus, in call-and-response format, runs:

Recordings 
The following recordings are by people with Wikipedia articles:
 1930Blind Willie Johnson
 1960"Come and Go with Me to That Land" by Hally Wood on the album Hootenanny at Carnegie Hall 
 1965"Come and Go with Me" by Peter, Paul and Mary on the album A Song Will Rise 
 1972"Come and Go with Me to That Land" by Bernice Johnson Reagon on the album River of Life/Harmony: One
 1984"Come and Go with Me to That Land" by Rune Larsen on the album Flammen 
 1999"Come and Go with Me to That Land" by Jesse L. Martin in an episode of the TV series The X-Files called "The Unnatural"
 2013"Freedom Suite: Oh Freedom/Come and Go with Me to That Land/I'm on My Way to Freedom Land/Glory, Glory Hallelujah" by Sweet Honey in the Rock on the album A Tribute: Live! Jazz at Lincoln Center

References 

Blind Willie Johnson songs
Peter, Paul and Mary songs
Year of song unknown
Blues songs
Gospel songs
Songwriter unknown